Henry, Duke of Cornwall (1 January 1511 – 22 February 1511) was the first living child of King Henry VIII of England and his first wife, Catherine of Aragon, and though his birth was celebrated as that of the heir apparent, he died within weeks.  His death and the failure of Henry VIII and Catherine to produce another surviving male heir led to succession and marriage crises that affected the relationship between the English church and Roman Catholicism, giving rise to the English Reformation.

Birth and christening

Henry was born on 1 January 1511 at Richmond Palace, the first live-born child of King Henry VIII and Catherine of Aragon, born eighteen months after their wedding and coronation. Catherine had previously given birth to a stillborn daughter, on 31 January 1510. He was christened on 5 January in a lavish ceremony where beacons were lit in his honour. The christening gifts included a fine gold salt holder and cup weighing a total , given by Louis XII of France, his godfather. His godmother was Margaret of Austria, Duchess of Savoy. Appearing as proxy for the French King was Richard Foxe, Bishop of Winchester, while the proxy for the Duchess of Savoy was Lady Anne Howard, daughter of Edward IV and the King's maternal aunt.

Celebrations and death
Henry VIII and his queen planned extravagant celebrations rivalling that of their joint coronation for the birth of their son, who automatically became Duke of Cornwall and heir apparent to the English throne, and was expected to become Prince of Wales, King of England, and third king of the House of Tudor. The tournament at Westminster was the most lavish of Henry's reign, and is recorded via a long illuminated vellum roll, known as The Westminster Tournament Roll to be found in the College of Arms collection.

The Duke of Cornwall died on 22 February 1511 at Richmond Palace, and was buried in Westminster Abbey.

References

|-

Heirs to the English throne
English people of Welsh descent
Dukes of Cornwall
Heirs apparent who never acceded
1511 births
1511 deaths
Burials at Westminster Abbey
16th-century English nobility
House of Tudor
Children of Henry VIII
Royalty who died as children
Sons of kings